Golaki (also Romanized as Golakī; also known as Gīlīkī and Gulaki) is a village in Baghak Rural District, in the Central District of Tangestan County, Bushehr Province, Iran. At the 2006 census, its population was 224, in 46 families.

References 

Populated places in Tangestan County